Ronald T. Sutter (born December 2, 1963) is a Canadian former professional ice hockey player. He is currently the Player Development coach for the Calgary Flames of the National Hockey League (NHL). He is the brother of Brian, Brent, Darryl, Duane and Rich Sutter, all of whom played in the National Hockey League (NHL). He is the twin brother of Rich and was the last Sutter brother to retire from the NHL.

Playing career
Ron Sutter was drafted 4th overall by the Philadelphia Flyers in the 1982 NHL Entry Draft, the same draft that saw his twin brother, Rich, get drafted 10th overall by the Pittsburgh Penguins. Ron and Rich both played on the Lethbridge Broncos in the WHL, and together they led that team to the Memorial Cup in 1983. Rich would only play 9 games for the Penguins after Junior, before being traded to Ron's Flyers. The three seasons that the pair played on the same team in Philadelphia were three of the best years of Ron's career.

Ron played with the Flyers until the 1991–92 season, when he was traded to the St. Louis Blues along with Murray Baron, for Dan Quinn and Rod Brind'Amour. Moreover, Rich was playing on the Blues at that time, and the two played two more seasons together. After that, Ron became somewhat of a journeyman in the NHL, playing for St. Louis, the Quebec Nordiques, New York Islanders, Boston Bruins, and San Jose Sharks within 4 seasons.

Sutter played 4 seasons with the Sharks, being coached by older brother Darryl Sutter, but most of his offensive skills had eroded, and he primarily became a defensive centre. Sutter only averaged 10 points a season in San Jose. Sutter would finish off his career with the Calgary Flames, and retired in 2001.

After retiring, Sutter worked for several seasons as a scout for the Calgary Flames.

Career statistics

Regular season and playoffs

International

See also
Captain (ice hockey)
List of NHL players with 1000 games played
Sutter family

External links
 

1963 births
Boston Bruins players
Calgary Flames coaches
Calgary Flames players
Calgary Flames scouts
Canadian ice hockey centres
Ice hockey people from Alberta
Lethbridge Broncos players
Living people
National Hockey League first-round draft picks
New York Islanders players
People from Beaver County, Alberta
Philadelphia Flyers captains
Philadelphia Flyers draft picks
Philadelphia Flyers players
Phoenix Roadrunners (IHL) players
Quebec Nordiques players
Red Deer Rustlers players
St. Louis Blues players
San Jose Sharks players
Canadian twins
Twin sportspeople
Ron
Canadian ice hockey coaches